Prateeksha Lonkar is an Indian actress who mostly appeared in Hindi and Marathi films and television series. She is best known for playing the lead title role in the Marathi TV serial Damini, that aired on DD Sahyadri.

Early life
Lonkar's father was a doctor and her mother a teacher. After finishing her schooling till 10th, she opted for Arts and followed her interest in theatre. Initially she was successful in Aurangabad, then she travelled to Mumbai.

Career
Lonkar moved to Mumbai for boosting her acting career. She worked in various TV serials both in Marathi and Hindi languages. After playing the lead role of Damini on the TV show of same name on DD Sahyadri, she came to be known for it. Her Hindi TV serial Kahaani Nahi.... Jeevan Hai was remade as Vasudha in Marathi. She played the lead role in both serials. She was the first woman to kiss over doordarshan. She did a kiss while playing a vamp in an episode of Byomkesh Bakshi.

Along with TV serials, she has also worked in many Marathi and Hindi-language films. Her portrayal of Sudha, a mother who is separated from her son after her divorce, in the Marathi film Bhet (2002) won her awards and appreciation. She played a mother of a young boy in 2007 film Aevdhe Se Aabhaal, where her son is not able to cope with his parents' divorce and his mother's remarriage. She has acted in several Bollywood films, including four films directed by Nagesh Kukunoor viz. Iqbal, Dor, Aashayein and Mod.

She has also worked in few Marathi plays.

Personal life
Lonkar is married to Marathi screenplay writer Prashant Dalvi.

Filmography

Films

Television

Theater

Awards
 2003 – Maharashtra Times (MaTa) Sanmaan for Bhet
 2003 – Star Screen Award for Best Actress in Marathi film for Bhet.
 2007 – Best Actor at Pune International Film Festival for Aevdhe Se Aabhaal.
 2008 –  Best Actress for Aevdhe Se Aabhaal.
 Vaibhav Purashkar by Print View Publications and Lions club.

References

External links
 

Indian film actresses
Living people
Actresses in Marathi cinema
Actresses in Hindi cinema
People from Aurangabad district, Maharashtra
Actresses from Maharashtra
Indian stage actresses
20th-century Indian actresses
21st-century Indian actresses
Actresses in Marathi television
Actresses in Hindi television
Indian television actresses
1968 births